This is a list of notable events in country music that took place in the year 1992.

Events
 January — After 23 years of its tried-and-true formula, the producers of Hee Haw unveil an extensively revamped show in time for the start of its belated 24th season. The show's new urban setting, along with more pop-oriented country guests, is a resounding failure and lasts only through the end of the season. That fall, viewers will be greeted with Hee Haw Silver – a collection of classic shows, with new introductions by longtime host Roy Clark; "Silver" will fill out the show's 25th (and final) season.
 June 27 - At a concert in Bonner Springs, Kansas, a heavily intoxicated Hank Williams Jr. repeatedly insults the crowd and exits the stage after only 20 minutes. Williams later issues an apology.
 August 28 — The major motion picture Honeymoon in Vegas is released. The soundtrack features several country music performers, including Dwight Yoakam, Travis Tritt and Trisha Yearwood covering Elvis Presley songs.
 October 23 — The major motion picture Pure Country is released, starring George Strait, who also sang the soundtrack.

No dates
 At age 52, former country star Jonie Mosby (of the 1960s-early 1970s duo Johnny and Jonie Mosby) makes national headlines when she becomes the oldest woman in the United States to undergo in vitro fertilization and successfully bear a child.
 Line dancing becomes a national fad, tied to the success of at least two major country music hits: Billy Ray Cyrus' "Achy Breaky Heart" and Brooks & Dunn's "Boot Scootin' Boogie." Throughout the rest of the decade, several major country music hits would have dance remixes, and several videos would be released.

Top hits of the year

Singles released by American artists

Singles released by Canadian artists

Top new album releases

Other top albums

On television

Regular series
 Hee Haw (1969–1993, syndicated)

Specials

Births
 May 19 — Lainey Wilson, rising country singer-songwriter of the 2020s ("Things a Man Oughta Know", "Heart Like a Truck").
 June 15 – Parker McCollum, country singer-songwriter known for his 2020 hit "Pretty Heart".
 June 26 — Jennette McCurdy, actress, screenwriter, producer, singer and songwriter.
 November 23 — Miley Cyrus, daughter of Billy Ray Cyrus; actress and singer.
 December 1 – Travis Denning, country singer-songwriter known for his 2020 hit "After a Few".

Deaths
 February 19 – Biff Collie, 66, country music disc jockey, promoter and journalist (cancer).
 October 25 — Roger Miller, 56, singer-songwriter best known for Grammy Award winner "King of the Road." (throat cancer)
 November 23 — Roy Acuff, 89, country music pioneer from the 1930s onward, and Grand Ole Opry institution. (heart failure)

Hall of Fame inductees

Bluegrass Music Hall of Fame inductees
The Stanley Brothers
Carter Stanley
Ralph Stanley

Reno and Smiley
Don Reno
Arthur Lee "Red" Smiley

Country Music Hall of Fame inductees
George Jones (1931–2013)
Frances Preston (1928–2012)

Canadian Country Music Hall of Fame inductees
Carroll Baker
Gordon Burnett

Major awards

Grammy Awards
Best Female Country Vocal Performance — "I Feel Lucky", Mary Chapin Carpenter
Best Male Country Vocal Performance — I Still Believe in You, Vince Gill
Best Country Performance by a Duo or Group with Vocal — At the Ryman, Emmylou Harris and the Nash Ramblers
Best Country Collaboration with Vocals — "The Whiskey Ain't Workin'", Marty Stuart and Travis Tritt
Best Country Instrumental Performance — "Sneakin' Around", Chet Atkins and Jerry Reed
Best Country Song — "I Still Believe in You", Vince Gill and John Barlow Jarvis (Performer: Vince Gill)
Best Bluegrass Album — Every Time You Say Goodbye, Alison Krauss & Union Station

Juno Awards
Country Male Vocalist of the Year — Gary Fjellgaard
Country Female Vocalist of the Year — Michelle Wright
Country Group or Duo of the Year — Tracey Prescott & Lonesome Daddy

Academy of Country Music
Entertainer of the Year — Garth Brooks
Song of the Year — "I Still Believe in You", Vince Gill and John Barlow Jarvis (Performer: Vince Gill)
Single of the Year — "Boot Scootin' Boogie", Brooks & Dunn
Album of the Year — Brand New Man, Brooks & Dunn
Top Male Vocalist — Vince Gill
Top Female Vocalist — Mary Chapin Carpenter
Top Vocal Duo — Brooks & Dunn
Top Vocal Group — Diamond Rio
Top New Male Vocalist — Tracy Lawrence
Top New Female Vocalist — Michelle Wright
Top New Vocal Duo or Group — Confederate Railroad
Video of the Year — "Two Sparrows in a Hurricane", Tanya Tucker (Director: Joanne Gardner)

ARIA Awards 
(presented in Sydney on March 6, 1992)
Best Country Album - Out of the Blue (Anne Kirkpatrick)

Canadian Country Music Association
Bud Country Fans' Choice Award — Rita MacNeil
Male Artist of the Year — Ian Tyson
Female Artist of the Year — Michelle Wright
Group or Duo of the Year — Prairie Oyster
SOCAN Song of the Year — "Did You Fall in Love with Me", Joan Besen
Single of the Year — "Take It Like a Man", Michelle Wright
Album of the Year — Everybody Knows, Prairie Oyster
Top Selling Album — Ropin' the Wind, Garth Brooks
Video of the Year — "Take It Like a Man", Michelle Wright
Vista Rising Star Award — Cassandra Vasik
Vocal Collaboration of the Year — Gary Fjellgaard and Linda Kidder

Country Music Association
Entertainer of the Year — Garth Brooks
Song of the Year — "Look at Us", Vince Gill and Max D. Barnes (Performer: Vince Gill)
Single of the Year — "Achy Breaky Heart", Billy Ray Cyrus
Album of the Year — Ropin' the Wind, Garth Brooks
Male Vocalist of the Year — Vince Gill
Female Vocalist of the Year — Mary Chapin Carpenter
Vocal Duo of the Year — Brooks & Dunn
Vocal Group of the Year — Diamond Rio
Horizon Award — Suzy Bogguss
Music Video of the Year — "Midnight in Montgomery", Alan Jackson (Director: Jim Shea)
Vocal Event of the Year — Marty Stuart and Travis Tritt
Musician of the Year — Mark O'Connor

Further reading
Kingsbury, Paul, "The Grand Ole Opry: History of Country Music. 70 Years of the Songs, the Stars and the Stories," Villard Books, Random House; Opryland USA, 1995
Millard, Bob, "Country Music: 70 Years of America's Favorite Music," HarperCollins, New York, 1993
Whitburn, Joel, "Top Country Songs 1944–2005 – 6th Edition." 2005.

References

Other links
Country Music Association
Inductees of the Country Music Hall of Fame

External links
Country Music Hall of Fame

Country
Country music by year